Raffaele Riefoli (born September 29, 1959 in Margherita di Savoia, Italy) is an Italian singer-songwriter who is better known as simply Raf.

Biography
Riefoli lived the few first years of the 1980s in London, England, before starting out his musical career in 1984, landing mostly in the new wave scene with his English language debut album, Raf. His first single, "Self Control", which he co-wrote with Giancarlo Bigazzi and Steve Piccolo, was a huge hit not only in his native Italy but also in Austria (No. 7), Switzerland (No. 1) and Germany, where the single climbed as high as No. 2 in the Media Control single chart and spent a total of seven weeks within the Top 10. Raf's version of the song also managed to enter the Top-40 in France.

"Self Control" was recorded and released contemporaneously by American pop star Laura Branigan, previously best known for the hit singles "Gloria" (another cover version originally released by Italian singer Umberto Tozzi) and "How Am I Supposed to Live Without You".  Branigan's version was released as the first single off her 1984 album, also titled Self Control, and became a worldwide dance and pop success, hitting No. 4 on the Billboard Hot 100 in the U.S.  Branigan's version hit the No. 1 spot in Germany, Austria, Switzerland, Sweden, South Africa and Canada, and was a major hit in Ireland, Australia, France, the Netherlands and the UK. Raf's version, which was charting high in numerous markets in 1984/85, was highly expected to become the most popular song in the history of the Italian music industry.

Other English-language singles from Raf, "Change Your Mind", "London Town" and "Hard", were not as successful, and after an unsuccessful 1987 re-release of his first album with two of these songs as bonus tracks, Riefoli began to transition from the new wave/dance-pop genre into a softer pop style featuring vocals in his native language. Raf has released 11 studio albums throughout the years, including the 1993 Cannibali, which has been certified six times platinum in Italy. That album contains many successful tracks including "Il battito animale", "Due" and "Stai con me".

Riefoli has also written songs for other Italian artists; the track "Si può dare di più", written for the trio Morandi-Ruggeri-Tozzi, won the first prize at the San Remo Festival. Riefoli co-wrote the song "Gente di mare" with Umberto Tozzi and Giancarlo Bigazzi, and his duet with Tozzi became Italy's entry in the Eurovision Song Contest 1987, placing third.  The recording was a top ten hit in Switzerland, Austria and Sweden.

In the German-speaking territories, where the German Red Army Faction, a terrorist cell, was popularly known by the acronym RAF, Riefoli was marketed as Raff, with a second "f". In the intervening years, a number of other artists including German and Italian artists unaffiliated with Riefoli have made recordings under the names Raf, RAF or R.A.F.

Raf continues to have a successful recording career in Italy with his latest studio albums, Metamorfosi (2008), Numeri (2011), Le ragioni del cuore (2012) reaching No. 4, No.6, No. 13 respectively in the Italian album charts.

Discography

Studio albums

Compilation albums

Live albums

Singles

As lead artist

As featured artist

References

External links

 Official Site

1959 births
Living people
Italian Italo disco musicians
Italian male singers
Eurovision Song Contest entrants of 1987
Italian-language singers
Eurovision Song Contest entrants for Italy
People from the Province of Barletta-Andria-Trani
English-language singers from Italy
Carrere Records artists
East West Records artists
Columbia Records artists